Cattleya bicolor is a species of orchid found in Brazil.

Chromosome numbers of several C. bicolor individuals have been determined, finding chromosome numbers of both 2n = 40 and 4n = 80 (tetraploid).

References
 IPNI — is a database of the names and associated bibliographical details of seed plants, ferns and fern allies. A collaborative project between Kew, Harvard and CSIRO (includes Index Kewensis compiled since 1883).
 EOL, Encyclopedia of Life.
 Catalogue of Life 2010 Annual Checklist.

External links

Footnotes

bicolor
bicolor
Plants described in 1836